Leonid Alexeyevich Nechayev (3 May 1939 – 24 January 2010) was a Russian children's film director.

Career
Nechayev's career as director was launched in 1974 with a film called Adventures in a City that does not Exist. He was also the creator of the popular musical fairy tales About The Little Red Riding Hood and The Adventures of Buratino. He was a prolific director at the studio Belarusfilm, where he worked for 17 years and shot 10 films. The Minsk Museum of Cinema has a hall exclusively dedicated to his creative legacy.

Death
Nechayev died on January 24, 2010, aged 70, following a stroke.

Selected filmography
Adventures in a City that does not Exist (1974)
The Adventures of Buratino (1976)
About the Little Red Riding Hood (1977)
Peter Pan (1987)

Awards
 State Prize of the Russian Federation (1993)
 People's Artist of Russia (2003)

References

External links

1939 births
2010 deaths
Russian film directors
People's Artists of Russia
Soviet film directors
State Prize of the Russian Federation laureates
Gerasimov Institute of Cinematography alumni
Belarusian film directors
Fantasy film directors